Orhan Ovacıklı (born 23 November 1988) is a Turkish professional footballer who plays as a right back for TFF First League club Erzurumspor.

External links

1988 births
Footballers from İzmir
Living people
Turkish footballers
Association football defenders
Bandırmaspor footballers
Çaykur Rizespor footballers
Büyükşehir Belediye Erzurumspor footballers
Süper Lig players
TFF First League players
TFF Second League players
TFF Third League players